Fernando Cos-Gayón y Pons (May 27, 1825 - December 20, 1898) was a Spanish journalist and politician.

Journalists from Catalonia
People from Lleida
Economy and finance ministers of Spain
Justice ministers of Spain
1825 births
1898 deaths
19th-century journalists
Male journalists
19th-century male writers